Presidential elections were held for the first time in Azerbaijan on 8 September 1991. The only candidate was Ayaz Mutalibov of the Communist Party of Azerbaijan, who won with 98.5% of the vote, with turnout reported to be 85.7%.

Results

References

President
Presidential elections in Azerbaijan
Single-candidate elections
Azerbaijan
Azerbaijan